Eagleton is an English surname. Notable people with the surname include:

Aileen Eagleton (1902–1984), English artist
Christophe Eagleton (b. 1982), American composer
Florence Peshine Eagleton (1870–1956), women's suffrage advocate
Nathan Eagleton (born 1978), Australian-rules footballer
Stephen Eagleton (born 1976), Australian soccer player
Terry Eagleton (born 1943), English literary critic and philosopher
Thomas Eagleton (1929–2007), American politician
William L. Eagleton (1926–2011), American writer and diplomat

Fictional characters 

Betty Eagleton (née Pendagast), fictional character on the ITV soap opera Emmerdale

English-language surnames